Big Wide Grin is the sixth studio album by Keb' Mo', it was released in 2001 by the Sony Wonder record label.

Track listing 
 "Everybody Be Yoself" (Chic Streetman) - 4:59
 "Love Train" (Kenneth Gamble, Leon Huff) - 4:29
 "Don't Say No" (Kevin Moore, Cynthia Tarr) - 4:17
 "Infinite Eyes" (Essra Mohawk, Kevin Moore, John Lewis Parker) - 4:57
 "Grandma's Hands" (Bill Withers) - 3:30
 "Color Him Father" (R. Lewis Spencer) - 3:3
 "Family Affair" (Sylvester Stewart) - 3:47
 "The Flat Fleet Floogie" (Slim Gaillard, Bud Green, Slam Stewart) - 2:04
 "I Am Your Mother Too" (Kevin Moore, Zuriani Zonneveld) - 4:03
 "Big Yellow Taxi" (Joni Mitchell) - 3:45
 "Isn't She Lovely" (Stevie Wonder) - 5:16
 "America the Beautiful" (Katherine Lee Bates, Samuel Augustus Ward) - 3:35

Sergio Gonzalez - Drums ( tr. 1,4,5,7,9 ) Laval Belle - drums ( tr. 2, 3) Roy McCurdy - drums ( 8,11 )
Freddie Washington - Bass (tr. 1,4,9 ) Kevin McCormick - Bass ( tr. 2,3,5,7,10 ), synth ( tr.7 )
Bob Hurst - Upright bass (tr. 8, 11)
Luis Conte –  Percussion (tr.1,2,4,5,9,10)
Jeff Young - piano, organ (tr. 1, 7), keyboards ( tr.2, 3), piano (tr. 8, 11)
Leo Nocentelli – Guitar ( tr.1 )
Greg Leisz - Mandola, Pedal Steel Guitar (tr.2)
Clayton Gibb - Banjo ( tr. 3 )
Joellen Friedkin – Electric Piano ( tr.4 )
Gerald Albright  – Tenor Saxophone ( tr.7 ), Charlie "Tuna" Dennis - guitar ( tr. 7 )

Sony Wonder albums
Keb' Mo' albums
2001 albums